The Acadia River flows Northerly over 82 km through seven municipalities in the MRC La Vallée-du-Richelieu, Les Jardins-de-Napierville and Le Haut-Richelieu, in Montérégie, on the South Shore of St. Lawrence river, the Quebec, Canada. The Acadia river empties into the Richelieu River, in Carignan, skirting the city of Chambly by the north.

Toponymy 

Formerly, each segment of the river was named differently at different times.

In 1673, the river is called "Mount Royal river" (Rivière de Mont Royal, in French) in the first acts of concessions of Chambly Lordship, located at its mouth. While the first settlers in the southern part (high) designate the "River of Morels" (Rivière des Morelles, in French). This wild plant that grows on the banks of the river, produces black berries. This designation derives from its original form to become "River Morales" (Rivière des Morales) in the early nineteenth century.

Under the British Government after the New France, the new English settlers use the toponym "Montreal River", a deviant translation of "River of Mount Royal". Upon arrival of the first French settlers in the Haut-Richelieu, the river is named "River of Montreal" (Rivière de Montréal) and "Little River Montreal" (Petite rivière de Montréal).

From the mid-nineteenth century, the segment of the river in the area of Sainte-Marguerite-de-Blairfindie is designated "River of Acadia"; it is where the exiled Acadians settled after 1768, however, the segments downstream and upstream, keep the designation of "Little river Montreal". These settlers were deported from Canada named their adopted land "La Cadie", "La Petite Cadie" (little Cadie) or "La Nouvellle Cadie" (New Cadie) in memory of the country of their origin, the old Acadia.

Toponym "Acadie"

In 1524, the Florentine Giovanni da Verrazzano (1485? -1528) explored the East coast of North America. From 1548 on a map of Gastaldo, the place name "Arcadia" therein to designate the area of Maryland and Virginia. According to Marcel Trudel, historian and teacher, Arcadia is a "place name that we carry to the north and turn under the influence of Mikmaq sounding in Acadia". The name refers to a region of ancient Greece, the rich mythological and literary plan, often described as the land in excellence of serenity and happiness. In 1604, Samuel de Champlain visited Acadia in the name of the King of France. It sets the current spelling by dropping the letter R. At the time, the place name "Acadie" is assigned to the peninsula of Nova Scotia. In 1605, Port Royal was founded by the French. Thus begins the colonization of Acadia, which spans much of the seventeenth century.

In 1713, under the Treaty of Utrecht, Acadia was ceded to England. In the mid 18th century the "Great Upheaval" occurs when those who refused to pay allegiance to the Crown Brythonic were deported to the British colonies of the American coast. The first wave of deportations, which occurred between 1755 and 1757, touched nearly ten thousand Acadians. Finally, in 1763, the Treaty of Paris finally gives Acadia to the British. Today, Acadia essentially corresponds to regions of New Brunswick, Nova Scotia and Prince Edward Island, inhabited by descendants of the inhabitants of the former French Acadia.

Registration of the toponym

In 1965, at the request of the Historical Society of the Richelieu Valley, the Geographic Board of Canada has officially registered its toponym registry the hydronym "L'Acadie River". However, the designation "Little Montreal River" remains in the language of the people of the concerned sectors and in concessions designations (rows).

The name "River Acadia " was officially registered on December 5, 1968, to the Bank of place names of the "Commission de toponymie du Quebec".

Geography 

The Acadia river takes it source from some streams at the foot of mountains near the Canada-United States border in the Hemmingford Township at Hemmingford. It flows north, almost in parallel to the Richelieu River (on west side). Besides passing through some villages (Napierville, Acadia and Chambly), Acadia River flows through agricultural and forest environments. The river is bordered by campaigns decorated with historical and modern buildings. Formerly, from Saint-Cyprien-de-Napierville and towards its mouth, heritage routes ran along on each side of the river route, but some segments of roads are now extinct. In winter, ice roads on the river allowed transportation vehicles drawn by animals or on foot, by avoiding cast parallel roads sometimes poorly managed and unplowed.

The course of the river flows through seven municipalities (or cities): Hemmingford, Saint-Patrice-de-Sherrington (where it flows eastward) Saint-Cyprien-de-Napierville, Napierville, Saint-Jean-sur-Richelieu (Saint-Luc and Acadia sector), Carignan and Chambly.

Description of the route of the river

The course of the river is meandering between the village of Acadia and Chambly Road (Quebec Route 112) at the limit of Chambly and Carignan. This segment of the river is ideal for spring flooding or heavy floods of the river, because of the low gradient.
 
In Saint-Jean-sur-Richelieu (Saint-Luc area), the natural environment along the river l'Acadie with an area of 645,834 sq.ft (6 ha) is an ecological heritage. In a conservation goal, the sector is subject to specific rules forbidding including any tree cutting, all new construction and all remblaiement.
 
Acadie River through the historic village of Acadie. Acadians, subject to a large deportation, generally from Boston, had settled in this area in 1782. They built the parish church, near Acadie River.
 
Mouth of the river
 
After touring the montérégienne plain, Acadia river empties into the Richelieu River at the mouth of the Chambly Basin; the mouth of the river is part of Carignan. In the last segment of its course, the river flows along the road 223 (Bellerive path) that bypasses by the North the Demers Island and Grande île (Great Island), located at the north of the Chambly Basin.

See also
La Vallée-du-Richelieu
Les Jardins-de-Napierville
Le Haut-Richelieu
Richelieu River
List of Quebec rivers

Notes and references

External links 
 COmité de COncertation et de VAlorisation du BAssin de la Rivière Richelieu

Rivers of Montérégie
Canada–United States border